Sir James Sawyer  (11 August 1844 – 19 January 1919) was a 19th-century British physician and cancer researcher.

Life

Sawyer was born in Carlisle on 11 August 1844 the son of James Sawyer and his wife Ann Ross. He studied Medicine at Queen's College, Birmingham graduating in 1866. He then took a post as a resident physician at Queen's Hospital, Birmingham becoming full Physician in 1871. He then also took on a secondary role as Physician at Birmingham Children's Hospital.

In 1873 he married Adelaide Mary Hill, daughter of Rev J. Harwood Hill of Cranoe in Leicestershire. They had two sons (including Lt Col James H Sawyer) and two daughters, one of whom married Dr H S French. In 1875 his alma mater elected him Professor of Pathology and in 1878 he also began lecturing in Materia Medica. He became Professor of Medicine (in charge of the whole department) in 1885. He was knighted by Queen Victoria in the same year.

He bought Haseley Hall, at Five Ways, Hatton, Warwickshire, Warwickshire, from Sir Edward Antrobus in 1889 and lived there for the rest of his life. He also has a house built in central Birmingham, in 1902, on Cornwall Street (now number 93, and Grade II* listed), by the architects T W F Newton and Cheattle, in Arts and Crafts style.

In 1891 he was elected a Fellow of the Royal Society of Edinburgh. His proposers were George Alexander Gibson, William Smith Greenfield, Sir Byrom Bramwell, and Alexander Bruce.

He retired in 1891 but delivered the Lumleian Lecture to the Royal College of Physicians in 1908 (Points of Practice in Maladies of the Heart). He was President of the Birmingham Conservative Association and the Warwickshire Chamber of Agriculture in 1902.

Sawyer died at Haseley Hall on 19 January 1919.

Cancer research

In 1900, Sawyer argued that the increased rate of cancer in England and Wales was due to the excessive consumption of red meat. He suggested in his 1912 book Coprostasis that colorectal cancer was practically unknown amongst agricultural labourers because they worked in fields and had the opportunity to defaecate in the natural squatting position.

Publications

A Guide to the Physical Diagnosis of the Diseases of the Lungs and Heart (1870)
Contributions to Practical Medicine (1886, 1912)
Coprostasis: Its Causes , Prevention and Treatment (1912)
Insomnia: Its Causes and Treatment (1912)

References

1844 births
1919 deaths
19th-century British medical doctors
Cancer researchers
English medical researchers
People from Carlisle, Cumbria
Fellows of the Royal College of Physicians
Fellows of the Royal Society of Edinburgh